Kathleen Gertrude Hurd-Wood  (née Chitty, 1 August 1886 – 10 April 1965) was a New Zealand advocate for the hard of hearing. She was born in Kirikiriroa, near Hamilton, New Zealand, on 1 August 1886.

In the 1961 Queen's Birthday Honours, Hurd-Wood was appointed a Member of the Order of the British Empire, for services to the League of Hard of Hearing.

References

1886 births
1965 deaths
People from Hamilton, New Zealand
New Zealand activists
New Zealand women activists
New Zealand Members of the Order of the British Empire